= Cocol =

Mexican bread

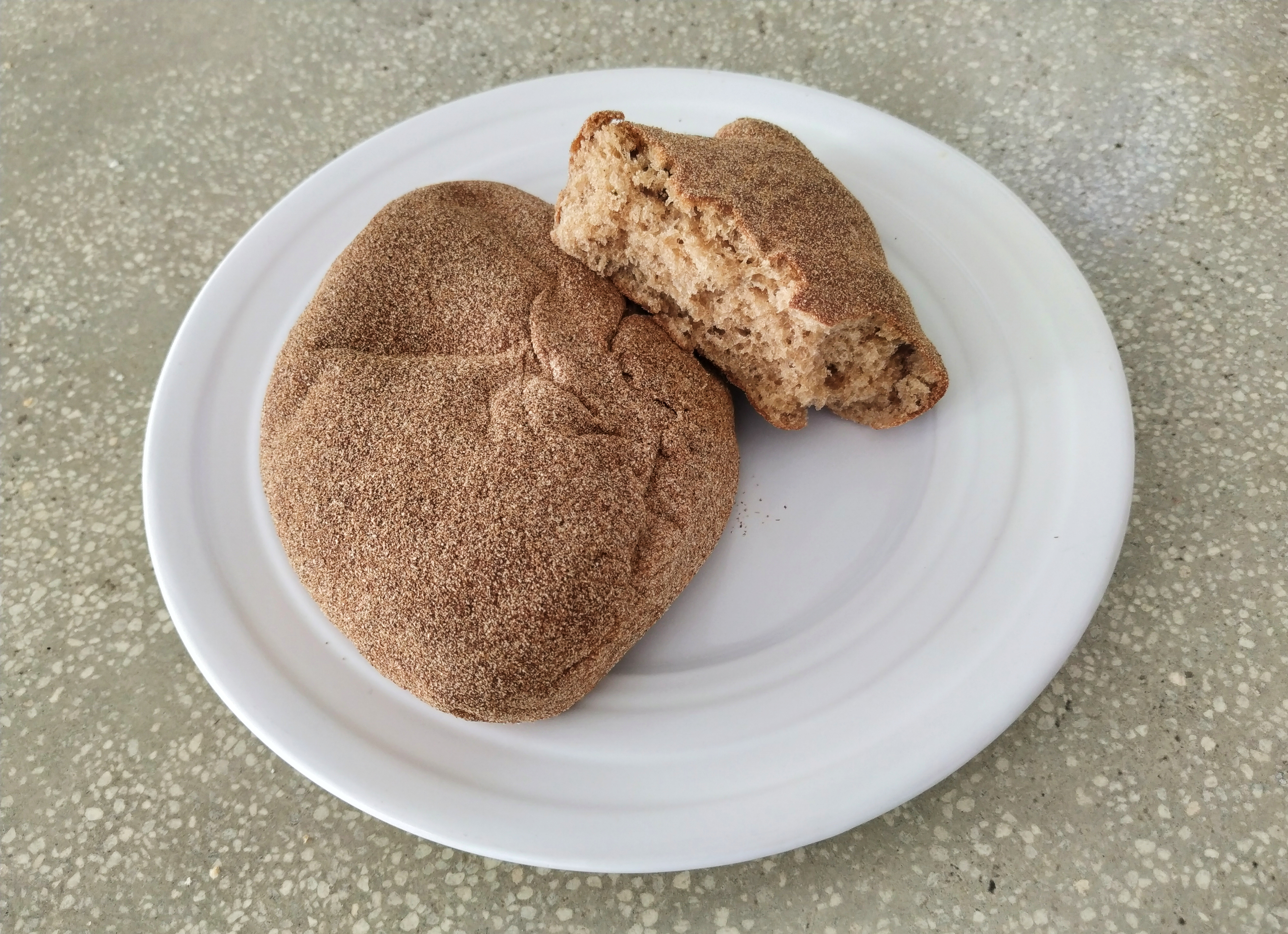
- Alternative names: Torito, Cocolli
- Type: Bread
- Place of origin: Mexico
- Main ingredients: Wheat flour, milk, eggs

Cocol is one of the oldest types of bread known in Mexico. It was created when the Spanish invaded the Mesoamerican cultures. The Spanish taught Mesoamericans how to bake a bread, and then they made their own with the ingredients that were common at that time. This new bread was called cocol, from the word cocolli in Nahuatl. It is also known as torito in some parts of the country. Cocol is made out of wheat flour, milk and some eggs. Before it is baked, the mass is given the figure of a rhombus. It is usually eaten with jam.
